Yas Waterworld Abu Dhabi is an Emirati-themed waterpark located on Yas Island in Abu Dhabi, United Arab Emirates, that is  home to 45 rides, slides and attractions, and a diversity of seasonal events and shows. The waterpark is just minutes away from Ferrari World Abu Dhabi, Warner Bros. World Abu Dhabi, and CLYMB Abu Dhabi.

Set across more than 15 hectares of land, the waterpark was developed by Aldar Properties and supported by Blackburn Share Holdings. Yas Waterworld is managed and operated by Abu Dhabi-based Miral Asset Management LLC.

The waterpark has played host to the World Flowboarding Championships since 2013 and it offers special training sessions to learn to ride the waves on body boards called Yas Flow League.

The Theme 
Yas Waterworld’s theme is based on an original story developed exclusively for the waterpark: The legend of The Lost Pearl.  This tale is inspired by Emirati culture and history, and follows the adventures of Dana, a young Emirati girl in search of a legendary pearl that had once brought prosperity to her village. Seeing how hard life was in her village, Dana voyaged across the desert with bandits in hot pursuit, to find the mighty pearl and bring prosperity back to her village.

Design 
Yas Waterworld reflects traditional Emirati architecture in the entirety of the waterpark’s design. It includes a detailed authenticity to historic Emirati heritage with an Arabian castle-like exterior design, and a village-like interior design.

The conception and engineering of the Emirati fantasy theme waterpark was built on the narrative of The Legend of the Lost Pearl, which is inspired by Emirati culture and history, and is obvious in the waterpark’s architecture, attractions, and thrills. Its pearl is seen from outside the waterpark, and all the characters, attractions, shops and restaurants are also based on the story.

Rides, slides and attractions 
The waterpark's attractions are grouped into four categories: Adrenaline Rush (extreme thrill), Exciting Adventures (high thrill), Moving and Grooving, and Young Fun (low thrill). The highest rides are Jebel Drop and Hamlool's Humps, and the fastest is Liwa Loop. The waterpark includes six rides that can’t be found anywhere else in the world: Bandit Bomber, Bubble’s Barrel, Cinesplash, Dawwama, Falcon’s Falaj and Slithers Slides.

Rides

Adrenaline Rush 
 Falcons Falaj
 Bubbles Barrel
 Liwa Loop
 Dawwama
 Hamlool’s Hump
 Jebel Drop

Exciting Adventures 
 Sebag – Six line mat race
 Bandit Bomber
 Rush Rider
 Bubbles Barrel
 Cinesplash
 Jabha Zone
 Water Wars and Dunk Tanks
 Slither’s Slides – Six different tube slides
 Amwaj Wave Pool
 Amwaj Beach
 Yadi Yas – Wave river
 Yadi Yas Beach

Moving and Grooving 
 Al Raha River
 Water Wars
 Marah Fortress
 Fish Pipe – Rotating Barrel Ride
 Al Raha River – Lazy River
 Al Raha Beach

Young Fun 
 Yehal
 Tot’s Playground
 Cannon Point

Themed Experiences 
 Ladies Season
 Neon Nights
 Kabayan Nights
 Yas Pearl Diving Experience
 PearlMasters
 Underwater VR experience
 Al Waha Cabanas
 Jebel Dana
 Mina Al Jewana

Awards and nominations 
Since the park’s opening in 2013, it won many awards including the following awards:
 The Leading Edge Award at the World Waterpark Association's Annual Show, in Las Vegas, USA in October 2012.
 Named the “second best waterpark in the world” by the Los Angeles's Ranking of the World’s Top 20 Waterparks feature in May 2013.
 Won the World Travel Awards award for the Middle East’s Leading Tourist Attraction of the year 2013.
 The Bandit Bomber is the first roller coaster to be incorporated into a waterpark and was ranked amongst the world’s newest, biggest and baddest roller coasters for the summer of 2013, by CNN.
 WWA 2014 Wave Review Award – Best Promotion of the Year
 What’s On Abu Dhabi – Favourite Day Out
 2012 Leading Edge Award - World Waterpark Association's Annual Show, in Las Vegas, USA - October, 2012
 Top 10 Water Park in the Middle East 2017 by TripAdvisor Traveler's Choice.
 Theme and Waterpark of the Year given by Mother Baby & Child Magazine for 2016 and Waterpark of the Year for 2017. 
 Voted "Favourite Day Out" and "Favourite Ladies' Night" at the What’s On Awards 2018
 Voted 'Middle East's Leading Water Park' - winner of the World Travel Award 2018, 2019, 2020
 Voted ‘World’s Leading Waterpark’ award by World Travel Award 2018, 2019, 2020
 Winner of 2018, 2019 and 2020 "Best Waterpark" by Menalac
 Guinness World Record for The Most Nationalities in a Swimming Pool in April 2019
 The Best Waterpark award by Global Brand Awards 2020
 Middle East’s Best Water Theme Park by the International Travel Awards 2020
 Trip Advisor Traveler’s Choice certificate in 2020

References

Buildings and structures in Abu Dhabi
Water parks in the United Arab Emirates
Tourist attractions in Abu Dhabi
Central Region, Abu Dhabi